Hoosiers (released in some countries as Best Shot) is a 1986 American sports drama film written by Angelo Pizzo and directed by David Anspaugh in his feature directorial debut. It tells the story of a small-town Indiana high school basketball team that enters the state championship. It is inspired in part by the Milan High School team who won the 1954 state championship.

Gene Hackman stars as Norman Dale, a new coach with a spotty past. The film co-stars Barbara Hershey and Dennis Hopper, whose role as the basketball-loving town drunk earned him an Oscar nomination. Jerry Goldsmith was also nominated for an Academy Award for his score. In 2001, Hoosiers was selected for preservation in the United States National Film Registry by the Library of Congress as being "culturally, historically, or aesthetically significant."

Plot

In 1951, Norman Dale arrives in rural Hickory, Indiana. His old friend, high school principal Cletus Summers, has hired him as the civics and history teacher and as head basketball coach.

The townspeople, passionate about basketball, are disappointed that Hickory's best player, Jimmy Chitwood, has left the team following the death of the previous coach, who had been a surrogate father to Jimmy. At a meet-and-greet, Dale tells the townspeople he used to coach college basketball. The next day, fellow teacher Myra Fleener warns Dale not to recruit Jimmy. She is encouraging Jimmy to focus solely on his studies so that he will have a future away from Hickory.

The small school has only seven players. At the first practice, Dale dismisses Buddy Walker for rudeness, causing another player, Whit Butcher, to walk out in protest. Dale begins drilling the others (Rade Butcher, Merle Webb, Everett Flatch, Strap Purl, and equipment manager Ollie McLellan) with fundamentals and conditioning but no scrimmages or shooting, much to the Huskers' dismay. Whit later apologizes to Dale and rejoins the team.

Dale instructs the Huskers to pass four times before shooting. During the season opener, Rade disobeys and repeatedly makes baskets without passing first. Dale benches him for the rest of the game, even when Merle fouls out, leaving only four Huskers on the floor. In a subsequent game, when a rival player jabs Dale in the chest during an on-court argument, Rade jumps to his defense and hits the player. During the altercation, Principal Summers, acting as assistant coach, suffers a mild heart attack. Dale further erodes community support by employing a slow, defensive style that does not immediately produce results. Dale also loses his temper on court and gets ejected from two games.

With Summers laid up, Dale asks former Husker Wilbur "Shooter" Flatch, Everett's alcoholic father, to be his assistant coach, with the requirement that Shooter be sober during all games and practices. Shooter agrees, on the condition that Dale not get ejected from any more games. Dale's choice of Shooter confounds the town and embarrasses Everett.

Mid-season, disgruntled townspeople decide to vote on dismissing Dale. Before the meeting, Fleener, sensing something amiss regarding Dale's past, uncovers years-old information about his hitting a player and being banned from coaching. However, Fleener chooses not to reveal this fact to the townspeople, instead telling them at the meeting to give Dale another chance. Nevertheless, they vote to fire the coach. Then Jimmy Chitwood arrives and announces he will rejoin the team, but only if Dale remains as coach. A new vote is taken, and the residents overwhelmingly choose to keep Dale. 

After Jimmy's return, the reinvigorated Huskers rack up a series of wins. To prove to the townspeople (and to Shooter himself) Shooter's value to the team, Dale intentionally gets ejected from a game. This forces Shooter to devise a play that helps Hickory win on a last-second shot.  Shooter also regains the respect of his son, Everett.

Despite a setback when Shooter relapses, the team advances through the state tournament with Jimmy's strong performance. Unsung players, such as short Ollie and devoutly religious Strap, also contribute. Hickory reaches the championship game in Indianapolis.

At Butler Fieldhouse, and before the largest crowd they have ever seen, the Huskers face long odds to defeat the heavily favored South Bend Central Bears, who have taller and more athletic players. After falling behind, Hickory fights their way back and ties the game with just a few seconds left. Dale calls his team's final timeout and sets up a play for Jimmy to put up the last shot. He scores as the game buzzer sounds, and Hickory wins the 1952 Indiana state championship. Sometime after the game, a large black-and-white photograph of Coach Dale and the team with their state championship trophy is seen hanging in the Hickory High School gymnasium, with a voiceover from Dale stating, "I love you guys."

Cast

 Gene Hackman as Norman Dale
 Barbara Hershey as Myra Fleener
 Dennis Hopper as Shooter Flatch
 Sheb Wooley as Cletus Summers
 Maris Valainis as Jimmy Chitwood
 David Neidorf as Everett Flatch
 Brad Long as Buddy Walker
 Steve Hollar as Rade Butcher
 Brad Boyle as Whit Butcher
 Wade Schenck as Ollie McLellan
 Kent Poole as Merle Webb
 Scott Summers as Strap Purl
 Fern Persons as Opal Fleener
 Chelcie Ross as George Walker
 Michael Sassone as Preacher Purl
 Gloria Dorson as Millie
 Hilliard Gates as Radio Announcer
 Michael O'Guinne as Rooster
 Wil Dewitt as Reverend Doty
 John Robert Thompson as Sheriff Finley

Basis
 The film is inspired in part by the story of the 1954 Indiana state champions, Milan High School. The phrase "inspired by a true story" is more appropriate than "based on a true story" because the two teams have little in common.

In most U.S. states, high school athletic teams are divided into different classes, usually based on the number of enrolled students, with separate state championship tournaments held for each classification. In 1954, Indiana conducted a single state basketball tournament for all its high schools. This practice continued until 1997.

Some plot points are similar to Milan's real story. Like the film's fictional Hickory High School, Milan was a very small high school in a rural, southern Indiana town. Both schools had undersized teams. Both Hickory and Milan won the state finals by 2 points: Hickory won 42–40, and Milan won 32–30. The last seconds of the Hoosiers state final are fairly close to the details of Milan's 1954 final; the last basket in the film was made from virtually the same spot on the floor as Bobby Plump's actual game-winner. The movie's final game was filmed in the same gymnasium that hosted the 1954 Indiana state championship game, Butler University's Hinkle Fieldhouse (called Butler Fieldhouse in 1954) in Indianapolis.

Unlike the film's plot, the 1954 Milan Indians came into the season as heavy favorites and finished the '53–'54 regular season at 19–2. In addition, the 1952–1953 team went to the state semifinals, and they were considered a powerhouse going into the championship season despite the school's small enrollment.

Production

During filming in the autumn of 1985, on location at Hinkle Fieldhouse, directors were unable to secure enough extras for shooting the final scenes even after casting calls through the Indianapolis media. To help fill the stands, they invited two local high schools to move a game to the Fieldhouse. Broad Ripple and Chatard, the alma mater of Maris Valainis who played the role of Jimmy Chitwood, obliged, and crowd shots were filmed during their actual game. Fans of both schools came out in period costumes to serve as extras and to supplement the hundreds of locals who had answered the call. At halftime and following the game, actors took to the court to shoot footage of the state championship scenes, including the game-winning shot by Hickory.

The film's producers chose New Richmond, Indiana to serve as the fictional town of Hickory and recorded most of the film's location shots in and around the community. Signs on the roads into New Richmond still recall its role in the film. In addition, the old schoolhouse in Nineveh was used for the majority of the classroom scenes and many other scenes throughout the film.

The home court of Hickory is located in Knightstown and is now known as the "Hoosier Gym."

Pizzo and Anspaugh shopped the script for two years before they finally found investment for the project. Despite this seeming approval, the financiers approved a production budget of only $6 million, forcing the crew to hire most of the cast playing the Hickory basketball team and many of the extras from the local community around New Richmond. Gene Hackman also predicted that the film would be a "career killer." Despite the small budget, dire predictions, and little help from distributor Orion Pictures, Hoosiers grossed over $28 million and received two Oscar nominations (Dennis Hopper for Best Supporting Actor and Jerry Goldsmith for Best Original Score).

Shortly after the film's release, five of the actors who portrayed basketball players in the film were suspended by the NCAA from their real-life college basketball teams for three games. The NCAA determined that they had been paid to play basketball, making them ineligible.

Soundtrack

The music to Hoosiers was written by veteran composer Jerry Goldsmith. Goldsmith used a hybrid of orchestral and electronic elements in juxtaposition to the 1950s setting to score the film. He also helped tie the music to the film by using recorded hits of basketballs on a gymnasium floor to serve as additional percussion sounds. Washington Post film critic Paul Attanasio praised the soundtrack, writing, "And it's marvelously (and innovatively) scored (by composer Jerry Goldsmith), who weaves together electronics with symphonic effects to create a sense of the rhythmic energy of basketball within a traditional setting."

The score would go on to garner Goldsmith an Oscar nomination for Best Original Score, though he ultimately lost to Herbie Hancock for Round Midnight.  Goldsmith would later work with filmmakers Angelo Pizzo and David Anspaugh again on their successful 1993 sports film Rudy.

Until 2012, the soundtrack was primarily available under the European title Best Shot, with several of the film's cues not included on the album. In 2012, Intrada Records released Goldsmith's complete score, marking the first time the soundtrack has been released on CD in the United States.

Reception

Critical response
Hoosiers received positive reviews. Rotten Tomatoes gives the film a "Certified Fresh" 91% rating based on reviews from 44 critics, with an average score of 7.5/10.  The critical consensus is that "it may adhere to the sports underdog formula, but Hoosiers has been made with such loving craft, and features such excellent performances, that it's hard to resist." Metacritic gave the movie a score of 76 based on 13 reviews, indicating "generally favorable reviews."

Chicago Sun-Times critic Roger Ebert praised the film, writing:

Ebert closed his review with the comment "It's a movie that is all heart."

The New York Times' Janet Maslin echoed Ebert's sentiments, writing,  Washington Post critics Rita Kempley and Paul Attanasio both enjoyed the film, despite its perceived sentimentalism and lack of originality. Kempley wrote,  Attanasio pointed out some problems with the film: 

Time magazine's Richard Schickel praised the performance of Gene Hackman, writing that he was  Variety wrote that the 

Pat Graham of the Chicago Reader was the rare dissenter, writing of the film that

Accolades
Hoosiers has been named by many publications as the best or one of the best sports movies ever made.

Hoosiers was ranked number 13 by the American Film Institute on its 100 Years... 100 Cheers list of most inspirational films. The film was the choice of the readers of USA Today as the best sports movie of all time. In 2001, Hoosiers was selected for preservation in the United States National Film Registry by the Library of Congress as being "culturally, historically, or aesthetically significant" due in part to an especially large number of nominations from Indiana citizens.

In June 2008, AFI revealed its "Ten top Ten" — the best ten films in ten classic American film genres — after polling over 1,500 people from the creative community. Hoosiers was acknowledged as the fourth best film in the sports genre.

A museum to commemorate the real-life achievements of the 1954 Milan team has been established.

In 2015, MGM partnered with the Indiana Pacers to create Hickory uniforms inspired by the film. The Pacers first wore the tribute uniforms during select games in the 2015–16 NBA regular season in honor of the film's 30th anniversary.

In April 2017, Vice President Mike Pence said that Hoosiers is the “greatest sports movie ever made" while traveling on a flight from Indonesia to Australia with a pool of journalists.

American Film Institute Lists
 AFI's 100 Years...100 Cheers - #13

See also

 Hoosier Hysteria
 Hoosier Gym

References

External links

 
 
 
 The Hoosiers Archive
 

Hoosiers essay by Daniel Eagan in America's Film Legacy: The Authoritative Guide to the Landmark Movies in the National Film Registry, A&C Black, 2010 , pages 791-792 

1986 films
1980s sports drama films
1980s high school films
1986 independent films
American sports drama films
American basketball films
American independent films
American teen films
Basketball in Indiana
Films directed by David Anspaugh
Films scored by Jerry Goldsmith
Films set in 1951
Films set in 1952
Films set in Indiana
Films shot in Indiana
Orion Pictures films
Sports films based on actual events
United States National Film Registry films
Biographical films about educators
Biographical films about sportspeople
Cultural depictions of basketball players
Cultural depictions of American men
1986 directorial debut films
1986 drama films
Indiana culture
1980s English-language films
1980s American films